Daetong-bap is a native food of Damyang province in Jeollanam-do and is also called Juktong-bop. Damyang has the largest number of bamboos in Korea because soil and climate are suitable for growing bamboo. The bamboo in this area  is not only large in size but also solid and hard. Bamboo grown more than 3 years is best suited for Daetong-bap, and it is recommended to use bamboo only once to impregnate rice with bamboo fragrance.

See also  
 Khao lam
 Kralan

References 

Korean cuisine
Rice dishes